Canary grass is a plant, Phalaris canariensis, belonging to the family Poaceae.  Originally a native of the Mediterranean region, it is now grown commercially in several parts of the world for birdseed.

Description 
Phalaris canariensis resembles Phalaris arundinacea (reed canary grass), a perennial forage crop and a wild grass. Although heads of both crops are panicles, Phalaris canariensis heads resemble club wheat. Single flowers occur in dense clusters in May to mid-June or August. Inflorescences are green or slightly purple at first, then become tan.

Seeds 

The seeds are shiny brown. The seed is used as bird food and is generally mixed with rapeseed and other seeds that cheapen it. It should be kept in a dry place and away from vermin. Industrially, a flour made from seed is employed in the manufacture of fine cotton goods and silk stuffs.

In the Canary Islands, Italy and North Africa, Phalaris canariensis is used as food. In certain parts of Mexico, such as Valle de Bravo, it is prepared and sold by street food vendors as a much appreciated form of atole. However, the seed hulls appear to contain silica fibers, which are linked to esophageal cancer. In 2013, a new hull-less or glabrous variety was announced as a gluten-free food for humans.

References

External links

Alternative Field Crops Manual
Silica fibers in canary seed linked to oesophageal cancer
Silica fibers in canary seed linked to cancer in Iran

Phalaris (plant)
Cereals
Flora of North Africa
Flora of Africa
Flora of Europe